Christian Friedrich Johannes Büttner (born 1 June 1979), known professionally as TheFatRat, is a German DJ, record producer and musician. His genre is often described as "glitch-hop". He is best known for his 2016 extended play Jackpot which reached 23 on the Billboard Dance/Electronic Albums chart. He peaked at 15 on Billboard's Next Big Sound chart in February 2015.

Music career
Büttner began producing music in 2001 under his real name. He began by making background music for television, radio and advertisements and produced music for DJs.

In 2010, Büttner produced the song Mignon Mignon for René la Taupe, which became a number-one single in France. Around that time, he also produced the song "Audubon Ballroom" on Lupe Fiasco's album Food & Liquor II: The Great American Rap Album Pt. 1, which charted at #5 on the Billboard 200.

In July 2011, he began making solo music under the pseudonym TheFatRat, a nickname given to him in his youth. His career began with the release of his first EP, Do Be Do Be Do.

By 2016, Büttner's music was used in over 1.5 million YouTube videos. His single "Unity"  was included on the album Sounds of Syndication Vol. 1 curated by Tom Cassell, one of the most subscribed streamers on Twitch.

In November 2016, Büttner released his second EP, Jackpot on the Universal Music label. The EP reached #23 on the Billboard Dance/Electronic Albums chart. In December 2016, Büttner started a record label, The Arcadium, in collaboration with Universal Music.

In June 2017, he released the single "Fly Away" featuring vocalist Anjulie. In July, he performed at the Electric Forest Festival. In October 2017, he released the single "Oblivion" featuring vocalist Lola Blanc.

In March 2018, he released the single "MAYDAY". In July 2018, he released "Warrior Songs", a music pack for the video game Dota 2, which has been made available in the game as of 13 September 2018, according to Matthew "Cyborgmatt" Bailey, director of operations of Team Secret.

In December 2018, he posted a video about how YouTube's content ID system is "broken", as one anonymous user known as Ramjets claimed all the earnings for his song "The Calling" and YouTube refused to settle the dispute. The claim was removed by YouTube later.

In February 2020, Redbull.com made a 10-minute documentary about Büttner and his career titled, TheFatRat: Everything You Ever Wanted To Know About Him. They released this within their article, "TheFatRat: Meet the EDM DJ who's elevated video game music to high art."

On 7 February 2020, Büttner released a sci-fi music video on YouTube starring himself and Maisy Kay for Büttner's song, "The Storm," which he performed with Kay. The music video was filmed in Iceland, with Surtshellir Cave on the first day, Hekla Mountain on the second day, and Hjörleifshöfði on the third and final day. Accompanying the music video is a game for mobile dubbed The Storm - Interactive, where one can play through the story of the video.

Discography

Albums

Extended plays

Singles

References

1979 births
Living people
German record producers
German electronic dance music musicians
Musicians from Göttingen
Electronic dance music DJs
Monstercat artists
Spinnin' Records artists
Universal Music Group artists